The FISU World University Games, formerly the Universiade, is an international multi-sport event, organized for university athletes by the International University Sports Federation (FISU). The former name is a portmanteau of the words "University" and "Olympiad".

The Universiade is referred to in English as the World University Games or World Student Games; however, this latter term can also refer to competitions for sub-University grades students. In July 2020 as part of a new branding system by the FISU, it was stated that the Universiade will be officially branded as the FISU World University Games.

The most recent summer event was the 2019 Summer Universiade in Naples, Italy. The most recent winter event was the 2023 Winter World University Games held in Lake Placid, United States from 11–21 January 2023, after the 2021 edition scheduled to be held in Lucerne, Switzerland was cancelled due the COVID-19 pandemic. The 2021 Summer World University Games were scheduled to be held in Chengdu, China, but due to the COVID-19 pandemic has been postponed three times and will now be held in 2023, after the 2023 Summer World University Games, set to be held in Yekaterinburg, Russia, were postponed after the 2022 Russian invasion of Ukraine. At this moment the 2023 Summer World University Games has the postponed status according to the official FISU website.

Precursors 
The idea of a global international sports competition between student-athletes pre-dates the 1949 formation of the International University Sports Federation (FISU), which now hosts the Universiade, and even the very first World University Games held in 1923. English peace campaigner Hodgson Pratt was an early advocate of such an event, proposing (and passing) a motion at the 1891 Universal Peace Congress in Rome to create a series of international student conferences in rotating host capital cities, with activities including art and sport. This did not come to pass, but a similar event was created in Germany in 1909 in the form of the Academic Olympia. Five editions were held from 1909 to 1913, all of which were hosted in Germany following the cancellation of an Italy-based event.

At the start of the 20th century, Jean Petitjean of France began attempting to organise a "University Olympic Games". After discussion with Pierre de Coubertin, the founder of the modern Olympic Games, Petitjean was convinced not to use the word "Olympic" in the tournament's name. Petitjean, and later the Confederation Internationale des Etudiants (CIE), was the first to build a series of international events, beginning with the 1923 International Universities Championships. This was followed by the renamed 1924 Summer Student World Championships a year later and two further editions were held in 1927 and 1928. Another name change resulted in the 1930 International University Games. The CIE's International University Games was held four more times in the 1930s before having its final edition in 1947.

A separate group organised an alternative university games in 1939 in Vienna, in post-Anschluss Germany. The onset of World War II ceased all major international student sport activities and the aftermath also led to division among the movement, as the CIE was disbanded and rival organisations emerged. The Union Internationale des Étudiants (UIE) incorporated a university sports games into the World Festival of Youth and Students from 1947 to 1962, including one separate, unofficial games in 1954. This event principally catered for Eastern European countries.

After the closure of the CIE and the creation of the first UIE-organised games, FISU came into being in 1949 and held its own first major student sport event the same year in the form of the 1949 Summer International University Sports Week. The Sports Week was held biennially until 1955. Like the CIE's games before it, the FISU events were initially Western-led sports competitions.

Division between the largely Western European FISU and Eastern European UIE eventually began to dissipate among broadened participation at the 1957 World University Games. This event was not directly organised by either group, instead being organised by Jean Petitjean in France (which remained neutral to the split), but all respective nations from the groups took part. The FISU-organised Universiade became the direct successor to this competition, maintaining the biennial format into the inaugural 1959 Universiade. It was not until the 1957 World University Games that the Soviet Union began to compete in FISU events. That same year, what had previously been a European competition became a truly global one, with the inclusion of Brazil, Japan and the United States among the competing nations. The increased participation ultimately led to the establishment of the Universiade as the primary global student sport championship.

Precursor events
Not recognized by FISU as Universide:

Summer World University Games

Location map

Editions

Medal table

Winter World University Games

Location map

Editions

Medal table

See also

 International University Sports Federation
 FISU World University Championships
 FISU America Games
 ASEAN University Games
 International Children's Games

References

External links 

 
 German University Sports Federation
 Official report of the Winter Universiade Innsbruck / Seefeld 2005
 Yahoo News : 2017 Taipei Universiade, 87% box-office success as the highest ever.

 
University and college sports
Multi-sport events
Recurring sporting events established in 1959
Biennial sporting events